Matthew Alan Perisho (born June 8, 1975) is an American former professional baseball pitcher in Major League Baseball. He bats and throws left-handed.

Career 
In 2008, Perisho played for the Tecolotes de Nuevo Laredo of the Triple-A Mexican League. In 22 starts, he went 6–8 with a 3.93 ERA. When the Mexican League season ended, Perisho signed with the Brother Elephants of the Chinese Professional Baseball League in Taiwan (Republic of China).

Perisho throws a low-90s fastball and a good slider, and he uses a changeup when necessary against right-handed batters.

Perisho resides in Chandler, Arizona, with his wife and two children.

External links
, or Retrosheet

1975 births
Living people
Albuquerque Isotopes players
American expatriate baseball players in Canada
American expatriate baseball players in Mexico
American expatriate baseball players in Taiwan
Anaheim Angels players
Baseball players from Iowa
Boston Red Sox players
Bravos de Margarita players
American expatriate baseball players in Venezuela
Bridgeport Bluefish players
Brother Elephants players
Cedar Rapids Kernels players
Chico Outlaws players
Colorado Springs Sky Sox players
Detroit Tigers players
Durham Bulls players
Florida Marlins players
Kansas City T-Bones players
Lake Elsinore Storm players
Major League Baseball pitchers
Memphis Redbirds players
Mexican League baseball pitchers
Midland Angels players
Oklahoma RedHawks players
Olmecas de Tabasco players
Pastora de los Llanos players
Pawtucket Red Sox players
Sportspeople from Chandler, Arizona
Tecolotes de Nuevo Laredo players
Texas Rangers players
Toledo Mud Hens players
Tucson Sidewinders players
Tulsa Drillers players
Vancouver Canadians players